Millstone Creek is a  long 3rd order tributary to the Deep River in Randolph, North Carolina.

Course
Millstone Creek rises on the Brush Creek divide about 0.1 miles south of Browns Crossroads in Randolph County, North Carolina and then flows southwesterly to join the Deep River about 2 miles southwest of Parks Crossroads, North Carolina.

Watershed
Millstone Creek drains  of area, receives about 47.3 in/year of precipitation, and has a wetness index of 389.06 and is about 37% forested.

See also
List of rivers of North Carolina

References

Rivers of North Carolina
Rivers of Randolph County, North Carolina